Secret Girlfriend is an American sitcom which was produced by FremantleMedia North America and aired from October 7 until November 11, 2009 on Comedy Central. The show features the viewer as the "star" of a dating satire, with the show's actors addressing the camera as if it were the lead character.

Secret Girlfriend originated as a web series created by Jay Rondot and Ross Novie, who are executive producers on the TV adaptation. The showrunner was Ben Wexler, also an executive producer. The series was recast for television. Each half-hour episode includes two eleven-minute segments.

On April 29, 2010, though no media websites officially announced the show's cancellation, Novie announced via Twitter that there would be no second season.

Cast

Main
 Derek Miller as Phil – Phil is one of the best friends and roommates of the main character, "You".  He and Sam make internet videos for a living. He, too, is a ladies' man, but not as successful as You are. Whenever he and Sam get into arguments, You tend to favor his side. He goes to extreme lengths to pick up girls, including buying a dog and getting a phone number that is one digit off of that of a crisis hotline. He strongly dislikes Mandy and encourages You to date Jessica instead.
 Michael Blaiklock as Sam – Sam is the other best friend and roommate of the main character, "You". He is overweight and was once mistaken for a woman at a lesbian bar because of his "man boobs". He is typically less successful with the ladies than either You or Phil are. He often goes out drinking with his roommates in an attempt to pick up women. He makes internet videos for a living alongside Phil. He always says hi to Mandy and supports Your relationship with Jessica. It is hinted in his first "wet dream" that he likes Mandy.
 Alexis Krause as Mandy, MandyCat – Mandy is the main character's, or "Your", rich yet emotionally unstable ex-girlfriend. She seems to be bipolar due to her constantly shifting moods and opinions toward You and her feelings about getting back together with You. Although You broke up with her three months earlier, You still have sex with her and she often follows you around to find out what You are doing with other girls. She is extremely jealous, and you fear what she will do if she finds out about Jessica, so you try to keep the two apart. However, due to her stalker-like tendencies, she finds out and the two get in a cat-fight. We learn in the Season 1 finale 2 part episode Mandy has a sister named Heather and her step-mom used to be her dad's maid.
 Sara E. R. Fletcher as Jessica Johnson – The main character, You, met Jessica in a liquor store and she asks for your number. Although she has had a boyfriend for the past two years named Chad, she often goes out with You and admits to having feelings for You. She gets along with your roommates, Phil and Sam, and the four of you often get into various schemes together. You try to keep her from Mandy, your crazy ex-girlfriend, as you fear for Jessica's safety, but the two eventually meet. Once Jessica breaks up with her boyfriend, she attempts to have sex with You, but is constantly interrupted and has to go out of town to a family reunion. When she gets back, the two of you get together and have a night of sex, thus beginning your relationship with her. She begins acting clingy, leading Phil to be concerned about the state of your relationship. When Mandy finally confronts her about taking you back she and Jessica get into a fight.

Recurring
 Taylor Cole as Martina, Hot Neighbor – a neighbor of Phil and Sam.
 Italia Ricci as Sasha –  Jessica’s friend, who is a lesbian.
 Tonya Kay as Cassidy – Sasha’s girlfriend.
 Dawan Owens as Chester – neighbor of You, Phil, and Sam. Appears in two episodes in Season 1.

Reception 
The show has received mostly negative reviews. It received a 49/100 on Metacritic. Matthew Gilbert of The Boston Globe wrote, "The script is built on viral-video-sized gags wrapped in teen-boy fantasies about strip clubs and dangerous women with big breasts. It's like Entourage without glamor, heart, or Ari, and it's like It's Always Sunny in Philadelphia without the twisted wit."

James Poniewozik of Time called Secret Girlfriend a "fascinatingly bad comedy," saying it was doomed not from being a "guy-oriented sex comedy" but from its second-person format: "[The format] sucks the life out of the characters. We're supposed to believe that You, the protagonist, are awesome, cool, funny, apparently irresistible. Why? You never say anything clever or charming. You never say anything...It makes all the interactions implausible (unless the viewer is an egomaniac)."

The A.V. Clubs Steve Heisler gave the show an F and wrote, "Secret Girlfriend is hardly a comedy show; hardly a 'show' for that matter. There's little-to-no plot, and jokes about characters are always sacrificed for jokes about dongs."  Brian Lowry of Variety wrote, "Expanding their web product, Jay Rondot and Ross Novie approach their task with all the finesse of a beer commercial, but it's periodically effective — and a bit like virtual porn." He called the show "fitfully funny."

Premium Hollywood gave the show a positive review for its fast pace and uniqueness.

Episodes

References

External links 
Secret Girlfriend at Comedy Central

2000s American mockumentary television series
2000s American sex comedy television series
2000s American sitcoms
2009 American television series debuts
2009 American television series endings
Comedy Central original programming
English-language television shows
Television series based on Internet-based works
Television series by Fremantle (company)